The 1999–2000 Coppa Italia was the 53rd edition of the tournament, which began on 15 August 1999 and ended on 18 May 2000. In the final, Lazio beat Internazionale 2–1 on aggregate to win their third Coppa Italia.

Group stage

Group 1

Group 2

Group 3

Group 4

Group 5

Group 6

Group 7

Group 8

Second round 
Bologna, Cagliari, Bari, Venezia, Hellas Verona, Piacenza, Perugia and Torino are added.

Third round 
Internazionale, Parma, Juventus, Fiorentina, Lazio, Roma, Udinese and Milan are added.

Quarter-finals

Semi-finals

Final

First leg

Second leg

Lazio won 2–1 on aggregate.

Top goalscorers

References 
 RSSSF.com

Coppa Italia seasons
Coppa Italia, 1999-2000
Coppa Italia, 1999-2000